Esther Ndeti, is a Kenyan mechanical engineer, businesswoman and corporate executive, who serves an executive director of the East Africa Private Equity & Venture Capital Association (EAVCA), based in Nairobi, the capital city of Kenya, effective 14 January 2017. Prior to her current position, she served as the regional coordinator for the Aspen Network of Development Entrepreneurs (ANDE).

Background and education
Esther was born in Kenya circa 1987. After attending primary school locally, she enrolled into Pangani Girls Secondary School, in Nairobi County, where she obtained her High School Diploma. She was then admitted to the University of Nairobi, where she graduated with a Bachelor of Science degree in mechanical engineering. She also holds a Diploma in Chinese Proficiency, obtained from the Confucius Institute at the University of Nairobi.

Career
Ndeti has had a varied career in business management stretchering back to 2007, when she served for a year, as the vice president of the corporate sector of the student organisation AIESEC. She then served as the national coordinator for the Trainers Team for the organisation, for another year.

After stints with two local companies, in Nairobi, she co-founded and served as director of Gregos Foods Limited, a Kenyan culinary business. In June 2015, she was hired as the regional coordinator for East Africa of ANDE, Aspen Network of Development Entrepreneurs at the Aspen Institute. ANDE is a global network of organizations that support entrepreneurship in emerging markets.

In February 2017, Esther was appointed as Executive Director of EVCA, responsible for (a) membership (b) networking (c) training (d) business initiatives (e) strategic partnerships and (f) media relations.

Family
Ms Esther Ndeti is a mother.

Other considerations
In 2010, she founded ARÊTE, an events management firm. In 2018, Business Daily Africa, a Kenyan daily English newspaper named Esther Ndeti, one of the Top 40 Under 40 Kenyan Women for the year 2018.

See also
 Eva Warigia
 Gladys Ngetich
 Anne Wawira Njiru

References

External links
Brief Biography 
PE firms invested Sh43 billion (US$430 million) in Kenya in 2017 As of 6 March 2018.

Living people
1986 births
21st-century Kenyan businesswomen
21st-century Kenyan businesspeople
Kenyan mechanical engineers
Kenyan women engineers
University of Nairobi alumni
Kenyan chief executives
21st-century women engineers